This list of American television awards is an index to articles about notable awards that are or were given by several organizations for contributions in various fields of television in the United States.

General

Emmy awards

An Emmy Award is an American award that recognizes excellence in the television industry.
Three related, but separate, organizations present the Emmy Award: the Academy of Television Arts & Sciences (ATAS), the National Academy of Television Arts & Sciences (NATAS), and the International Academy of Television Arts and Sciences (IATAS).
Awards include:
Creative Arts Emmy Awards
Daytime Emmy Awards
International Emmy Awards
Primetime Emmy Awards
Primetime Engineering Emmy Awards
Sports Emmy Awards

News and information

Technical

See also

 List of television awards

References

 
America